Patrik Schick (born 24 January 1996) is a Czech professional footballer who plays as a forward for  club Bayer Leverkusen and the Czech Republic national team.

Born in Prague, Schick began his career with local club Sparta Prague, rising through their youth ranks, before making his senior debut as a teenager. In 2016, at the age of 20, he earned a move to Sampdoria in Italy after an impressive spell with Bohemians 1905. After an impressive debut season in Italy, he moved to Roma in 2017 for a reported club-record fee. In 2019, Schick moved to Germany to join RB Leipzig on a season-long loan before moving to Bundesliga rivals Bayer Leverkusen on a permanent basis in September 2020.

Formerly an international at under-16, under-17, under-18, under-19, and under-21 levels, Schick made his debut for the Czech Republic in May 2016 at the age of 20. He has made over 30 caps for his country and helped the national team reach the quarter-finals of the European Championship in 2020, where he won both the Goal of the Tournament and the Silver Boot awards as the second-highest goalscorer of the tournament.

Early life
Growing up, his footballing hero was Manchester United player Wayne Rooney.

Club career

Sparta Prague
The Prague-born player was spotted by Sparta Prague when he was 11 years old. He made his top-flight debut for Sparta on 3 May 2014 in a 3–1 away loss at Teplice. Sparta would win the domestic double that campaign but four appearances over two campaigns meant Schick crossed town to join Bohemians 1905 on loan for the 2015–16 season. He scored 8 goals in 27 outings for Bohemians during a relegation battle. Schick returned to Sparta and was expected to feature prominently for the club during the 2016–17 season, but David Lafata was preferred and when Sparta offered Schick a new contract, his agent turned it down.

Sampdoria
Schick signed for Sampdoria in June 2016 for a reported fee of €4 million. In his first season in Italy, he appeared in 32 league matches and scored 11 goals for Sampdoria. He started 14 times and was able to find the back of the net once every 137 minutes.

In May 2017, he refused to extend his contract, expecting a transfer to another club. In June 2017, Juventus triggered the release clause of a reported €30 million on Schick's contract. Schick failed two separate medicals and Juventus backed out of the deal on 18 July.

Roma
On 29 August 2017 Schick joined Roma on a temporary deal for a loan fee of €5 million with a conditional obligation to buy the player once certain sporting objectives had been achieved, rising to €40 million, a club record fee. Upon signing, Roma sporting director Monchi described Schick as "one of the brightest prospects in international football." Schick spent most of his spell at Roma playing out on the right wing or left up front by himself and he scored only 8 times in 58 games.

2019–20 season: Loan to RB Leipzig
On 2 September 2019, RB Leipzig announced the signing of Schick on a season-long loan deal with an option to buy him permanently. His first goal for Leipzig came in a 3–2 defeat of SC Paderborn on 11 November 2019. This started a run of three goals in four league appearances including coming off the bench to complete the comeback and secure a 3–3 draw with Borussia Dortmund. Alongside Timo Werner, Schick rekindled his form with 10 goals in 28 games for Leipzig as the club finished in third place in the Bundesliga and reached the semi-finals of the Champions League.

Bayer Leverkusen
On 8 September 2020, Schick joined Bayer Leverkusen on a five-year deal for a reported fee of €26.5 million plus bonuses. Schick scored his first goal in a UEFA competition on 26 November 2020, coming in a 4–1 win over Israeli side Hapoel Be'er Sheva in the group stage of the Europa League.

Schick was the preferred centre-forward for much of the 2020–21 campaign at the BayArena and finished with 9 strikes across 29 league games.

On 4 December 2021, Schick scored four goals, all in the second half, in a 7–1 win over Greuther Fürth. Schick continued his good form in Leverkusen's next two league games, scoring a brace in each match against Eintracht Frankfurt and Hoffenheim respectively. He ended the 2021–22 Bundesliga season as second top scorer with 24 goals in 27 matches, then extended his contract with the club until 2027.

International career
Schick was called up to the Czech Republic senior side for the first time at their pre-UEFA Euro 2016 training camp. He earned his first cap for the nation in their tournament warm-up game against Malta on 27 May 2016. Schick scored his first goal for the national team in the same match, rounding out the scoring in a 6–0 win.

UEFA Euro 2020
On 25 May 2021, Schick was included in the Czech Republic's final 26-man squad for the postponed UEFA Euro 2020 tournament. In the first group stage match against Scotland on 14 June at Hampden Park in Glasgow, Schick scored both goals as the Czech Republic won 2–0. The goal was later voted as the "goal of the tournament", and was nominated for the FIFA Puskás Award. He became the first Czech player since Tomáš Rosický at the 2006 FIFA World Cup to score a brace at a major tournament and the first since Milan Baroš in 2004 to do so at the European Championships.

Against Croatia on 18 June, Schick scored from a penalty to help his side earn a 1–1 draw. On 27 June, he scored his fourth goal of the tournament in the Czech Republic's shock win over the Netherlands in the round of 16. On 3 July, he scored in a 2–1 defeat against Denmark in the quarter-finals, to equal Milan Baroš' record of five goals for the Czech Republic in a European Championship tournament. Alongside Cristiano Ronaldo, he was the UEFA Euro 2020 joint top scorer with 5 goals, with the higher of number of goals scored from an open play.

Style of play
Although Schick mostly plays in a central role as a main striker, due to his eye for goal, heading accuracy, and striking ability with his left foot; he is also capable of playing as a second striker or as a right winger. He can utilise his physique to hold up the ball with his back to goal, but is also a quick, elegant, and agile player, who possesses good technique and dribbling skills, as well as good link-up play, which enables him to play the ball first time, participate in the build-up of attacking plays and provide assists.

Personal life
Schick has an older sister, Kristýna Schicková (born 31 July 1994), who is a model and a social media influencer. In his teenage years, Schick considered a career as a male model but focused on competitive football instead. In July 2020, he married his long-time partner Hana Běhounková (born 1996), with whom he has a daughter, Victoria, born in October 2020, and a son, Nico, born in October 2021.

Career statistics

Club

International

Scores and results list Czech Republic's goal tally first, score column indicates score after each Schick goal.

Honours
Sparta Prague
 Czech First League: 2013–14
 Czech Cup: 2013–14
 Czech Supercup: 2014

Czech Republic
 China Cup bronze: 2018

Individual
 Czech Footballer of the Year: 2021, 2022
 Czech Golden Ball: 2022
 Czech Talent of the Year: 2016
 UEFA European Championship Silver Boot: 2020
UEFA European Championship Goal of the Tournament: 2020
 Bundesliga Player of the Month: December 2021
 kicker Bundesliga Team of the Season: 2021–22

References

External links

 Patrik Schick official international statistics
 
 

1996 births
Living people
Footballers from Prague
Czech footballers
Association football forwards
AC Sparta Prague players
Bohemians 1905 players
U.C. Sampdoria players
A.S. Roma players
RB Leipzig players
Bayer 04 Leverkusen players
Czech First League players
Serie A players
Bundesliga players
Czech Republic youth international footballers
Czech Republic under-21 international footballers
Czech Republic international footballers
UEFA Euro 2020 players
Czech expatriate footballers
Czech expatriate sportspeople in Italy
Czech expatriate sportspeople in Germany
Expatriate footballers in Italy
Expatriate footballers in Germany
Czech people of Austrian descent
Czech people of German descent